Atwood is a village in Douglas and Piatt counties in Illinois, United States. Main Street runs along the county line with Douglas County to the east and Piatt County to the west. The population was 1,116 at the 2020 census.

Geography

Demographics

As of the 2020 census there were 1,116 people, 472 households, and 340 families residing in the village. The racial makeup of the village was 96.15% White, 0.36% African American, 0.45% Asian, 0.00% Pacific Islander, 0.27% from other races, and 2.78% from two or more races. Hispanic or Latino of any race were 1.34% of the population.

There were 472 households, out of which 60.17% had children under the age of 18 living with them, 56.99% were married couples living together, 11.02% had a female householder with no husband present, and 27.97% were non-families. 26.48% of all households were made up of individuals, and 14.62% had someone living alone who was 65 years of age or older. The average household size was 2.86 and the average family size was 2.39.

The village's age distribution consisted of 25.7% under the age of 18, 5.7% from 18 to 24, 25.2% from 25 to 44, 25% from 45 to 64, and 18.5% who were 65 years of age or older. The median age was 38.9 years. For every 100 females, there were 77.9 males. For every 100 females age 18 and over, there were 86.8 males.

The median income for a household in the village was $48,750, and the median income for a family was $55,000. Males had a median income of $47,179 versus $32,857 for females. The per capita income for the village was $25,087. About 11.8% of families and 16.4% of the population were below the poverty line, including 23.9% of those under age 18 and 14.4% of those age 65 or over.

Notable people
 Kenneth L. Wilson, former commissioner of the Big Ten Conference and president of the United States Olympic Committee, was born in Atwood.

See also

 List of municipalities in Illinois

References

External links

 The Southern Piatt Record-Herald – Local newspaper
 The Atwood website – Jointly operated by the Village of Atwood, Atwood Chamber of Commerce, and Atwood Economic Development Committee

Villages in Douglas County, Illinois
Villages in Piatt County, Illinois
Villages in Illinois